Martin Karlsson (born January 5, 1991) is a Swedish professional ice hockey player. He is currently playing as an alternate captain of Leksands IF of the Swedish Hockey League (SHL).

Playing career
Karlsson played as a youth with hometown club, Leksands IF, and made his professional debut with the team in the HockeyAllsvenskan during the 2008–09 season.

Karlsson made his Swedish Hockey League debut playing on loan from Almtuna IS in the Allsvenskan, with AIK during the 2013–14 SHL season.

After four seasons away, Karlsson returned to his original club, Leksands IF in the Allsvenskan, signing a multi-year contract on 23 April 2015.

References

External links

1991 births
Living people
AIK IF players
Almtuna IS players
Leksands IF players
Swedish ice hockey forwards
People from Falun
Sportspeople from Dalarna County